Kristan is a surname. Notable people with the surname include:

Etbin Kristan (1867–1953), Slovenian politician and writer
Marijan Kristan (born 1937), Slovenian ice hockey player
Robert Kristan (born 1983), Slovenian professional goaltender 
William Kristan, American biologist

See also
Kristan (given name)